"L'étoile" (meaning "The Star") is a song recorded by Canadian singer Celine Dion, released on 11 October 2016 as the second single in Canada from Encore un soir (2016). The lyrics were written by Grand Corps Malade and the music was composed by Mutine (Manon Romiti and Silvio Lisbonne) and Florent Mothe. Lisbonne handled the production with Tiborg serving as an additional producer. On 4 January 2017, "L'étoile" was released as the third single in France.

Commercial performance
In early September 2016, after the release of Encore un soir, "L'étoile" entered the French Digital Singles Chart at number 189 and the French Overall Singles Chart at number 191. In late November 2016, "L'étoile" entered the Canadian Adult Contemporary chart at number forty and peaked at number thirty-five in December 2016. The single peaked at number thirty-five on the Radio Chart in France in March 2017 and number forty-four on the Airplay Chart in Belgium Wallonia in June 2017. It became the third top forty single from Encore un soir on the French Radio Chart. "L'étoile" also charted on the Ultratip chart in Belgium, reaching number six in Walonia and number thirteen in Flanders.

Music video
On 5 February 2017, the Lyric Video of "L'étoile" was uploaded on Vevo.

Live performances
Dion performed "L'étoile" during her 2017 tour.

Charts

Release history

References

2016 singles
2016 songs
Celine Dion songs
French-language songs
Songs written by Manon Romiti
Songs written by Silvio Lisbonne